Kvernes Church is a parish church of the Church of Norway in Averøy Municipality in Møre og Romsdal county, Norway. It is located in the village of Kvernes on the southeastern coast of the island of Averøya. It is the church for the Kvernes parish which is part of the Ytre Nordmøre prosti (deanery) in the Diocese of Møre. The white, wooden church was built in a long church style in 1893 by the architect A.K. Thoresen from Kristiansund. The church seats about 350 people.

History
By the late 1800s, the old Kvernes Stave Church had gotten to be too small for the parish, so it was decided to build a new church right next to the old one. The architect A.K. Thoresen from Kristiansund was hired to design the new building and the job of lead builder was originally awarded to a  builder named Hovde (also from Kristiansund), but he died before the work began. The job then went to builder L. Mogstad (also from Kristiansund). The church was consecrated on 9 August 1893. The bells from the old stave church were installed in the new church.

Media gallery

See also
List of churches in Møre

References

Averøy
Churches in Møre og Romsdal
Long churches in Norway
Wooden churches in Norway
19th-century Church of Norway church buildings
Churches completed in 1893
1893 establishments in Norway